Shahzada Mirza Fath-ul-Mulk Bahadur also known as Mirza Fakhru ( 1816 or 1818 – 10 July 1856) was the last Crown Prince of the Mughal Kingdom.

Biography
A senior Prince of the Mughal Royal Family, he was the son of Bahadur Shah Zafar, the last Mughal Emperor, through his wife Rahim Bukhsh Bai Begum.

Fath-ul-Mulk was named Crown Prince in 1853. However he predeceased his father, dying of cholera in 1856. Other sources suggest that he was poisoned.

Family
Fath-ul-Mulk was an older brother of Prince Mirza Mughal and the younger brother of former Crown Prince Mirza Dara Bakht.

Fath-ul-Mulk married several wives and was the father of several children. Among his wives was Wazir Khanum, daughter of a rich jeweller and a well-known beauty of the time. Wazir Khanum had previously been married to Shamshuddin, Nawab of Ferozepur Jhirka, a relative and close friend of Mirza Ghalib, and she had borne Nawab Shamshuddin a son, the noted poet Dagh Dehlvi. After the Nawab was hanged for plotting and paying for the murder of British officer William Fraser, Wazir Khanum married Fath-ul-Mulk, and he thus became the step-father of Dagh Dehlvi, who would later become a famous poet.

Among Fath-ul-Mulk's own sons were Mirza Abu Bakht and Mirza Fakhrunda Jamal. Among his daughters was Sikander Jehan Begum, who was married to a sufi mystic and became the mother of two daughters and a son, Mirza Qutb-e-Alam.

Sources

External links

1810s births
1856 deaths
Mughal princes
Timurid dynasty
People from Delhi
Deaths from cholera
Heirs apparent who never acceded